Agrochola bicolorago, the bicolored sallow or shield-backed cutworm, is a moth in the family Noctuidae. The species was first described by Achille Guenée in 1852. It is found in the eastern half of the United States (except southern Florida) and Canada.

The wingspan is 28–38 mm. Adults are on wing from August to December in the south and from September to November in the north.

References

Agrochola
Moths of North America
Moths described in 1852